The name Kay has been used for seven tropical cyclones in the Eastern Pacific Ocean and for one in the Australian region.

In the Eastern Pacific:
 Hurricane Kay (1980) – Category 4 hurricane that tracked along an irregular but generally west-northwest path out to sea.
 Tropical Storm Kay (1986)
 Tropical Storm Kay (1992)
 Hurricane Kay (1998) – a Category 1 hurricane that churned in the open ocean.
 Tropical Storm Kay (2004)
 Tropical Storm Kay (2016)
 Hurricane Kay (2022) – a Category 2 hurricane that made landfall in Baja California as a tropical storm.

In the Australian region: 
 Cyclone Kay (1987) – impacted Papua New Guinea and Western Australia.

Pacific hurricane set index articles
Australian region cyclone set index articles